The 2021 Nobel Prize in Physiology or Medicine was jointly awarded to the American physiologist David Julius (b. 1955) and Armenian-American neuroscientist Ardem Patapoutian (b. 1967) "for the discovery of receptors for temperature and touch." During the award ceremony on December 10, 2021, Nobel Assembly at Karolinska Institutet member Patrik Ernfors expressed:

Laureates

David Julius

David Julius was born in 1955 in New York, United States. He received a Ph.D. in 1984 from University of California, Berkeley and was a postdoctoral fellow at Columbia University in New York. In 1989, David Julius was recruited as professor to the University of California, San Francisco. He was the recipient of numerous prestigious awards such as the 2010 Shaw Prize in Life Sciences and Medicine, the 2010 Prince of Asturias Prize for Technical and Scientific Research, the 2020 Breakthrough Prize in Life Sciences, and the 2020 Kavli Prize in Neuroscience (together with Patapoutian) and the 2020 BBVA Foundation Frontiers of Knowledge Award.

Ardem Patapoutian

Ardem Patapoutian was born to an Armenian family in 1967 in Beirut, Lebanon. In his youth, he moved from a war-torn Beirut to Los Angeles, United States and received a Ph.D. in biology in 1996 from California Institute of Technology. He was a postdoctoral fellow at the University of California, San Francisco. Since 2000, he is a scientist at Scripps Research, La Jolla, California where he is now Professor. Since 2014, he is an investigator at the Howard Hughes Medical Institute. He was a recipient of the 2017 W. Alden Spencer Award, the 2019 Rosenstiel Award, 2020 Kavli Prize for Neuroscience, and the 2020 the BBVA Foundation Frontiers of Knowledge Award in Biology / Biomedicine.

Reactions
In announcing the winners, Thomas Perlmann, secretary-general of the Karolinska Institute, said: "This really unlocks one of the secrets of nature. It’s actually something that is crucial for our survival, so it’s a very important and profound discovery." The Nobel Committee believed that Julius and Patapoutian's discoveries address "one of the greatest mysteries facing humanity" – the sensation of the environment. Oscar Marín, director of the MRC Centre for Neurodevelopmental Disorders at King's College London, expressed that the choice of this year's winners underscored how little scientists knew about that question before the discoveries and how much there still is to learn.

Jan Adams, chief officer at Grünenthal, which markets pain relief skin patches and creams based on the TRPV1 capsaicin receptor discovered by Julius, said their discoveries had "opened up a whole new field of research for new non-opioid pain therapies". Fiona Boissonade, pain specialist at the University of Sheffield, said the Nobel laureates' work was especially relevant for the one in five people globally that suffer from chronic pain. She said: "Their research may lead us to identify new compounds that are effective in treating pain that don't come with the devastating impact of opioids."

Key publications
The following publications were the fundamental researches that motivated the Nobel Assembly at Karolinska Institutet to award the 2021 Prize to Julius and Patapoutian:

David Julius
 Caterina M.J., Schumacher M.A., Tominaga M., Rosen T.A., Levine J.D., Julius D. The capsaicin receptor: a heat-activated ion channel in the pain pathway. Nature 1997:389:816-824.
 Tominaga M., Caterina M.J., Malmberg A.B., Rosen T.A., Gilbert H., Skinner K., Raumann B.E., Basbaum A.I., Julius D. The cloned capsaicin receptor integrates multiple pain-producing stimuli. Neuron 1998:21:531-543.
 Caterina M.J., Leffler A., Malmberg A.B., Martin W.J., Trafton J., Petersen-Zeitz K.R., Koltzenburg M., Basbaum A.I., Julius D. Impaired nociception and pain sensation in mice lacking the capsaicin receptor. Science 2000:288:306-313
 McKemy D.D., Neuhausser W.M., Julius D. Identification of a cold receptor reveals a general role for TRP channels in thermosensation. Nature 2002:416:52-58

Ardem Patapoutian
 Peier A.M., Moqrich A., Hergarden A.C., Reeve A.J., Andersson D.A., Story G.M., Earley T.J., Dragoni I., McIntyre P., Bevan S., Patapoutian A. A TRP channel that senses cold stimuli and menthol. Cell 2002:108:705-715
 Coste B., Mathur J., Schmidt M., Earley T.J., Ranade S., Petrus M.J., Dubin A.E., Patapoutian A. Piezo1 and Piezo2 are essential components of distinct mechanically activated cation channels. Science 2010:330: 55-60
 Ranade S.S., Woo S.H., Dubin A.E., Moshourab R.A., Wetzel C., Petrus M., Mathur J., Bégay V., Coste B., Mainquist J., Wilson A.J., Francisco A.G., Reddy K., Qiu Z., Wood J.N., Lewin G.R., Patapoutian A. Piezo2 is the major transducer of mechanical forces for touch sensation in mice. Nature 2014:516:121-125
 Woo S.H., Lukacs V., de Nooij J.C., Zaytseva D., Criddle C.R., Francisco A., Jessell T.M., Wilkinson K.A., Patapoutian A. Piezo2 is the principal mechonotransduction channel for proprioception. Nature Neuroscience 2015:18:1756-1762

References

External links
Official website of the Nobel Foundation

2021
2021 awards